Alexander Dlugaiczyk (born 17 February 1983) is a German footballer who plays as a goalkeeper for Regionalliga Nord club TSV Havelse.

Career
Dlugaiczyk made his professional debut for TSV Havelse in the 3. Liga on 14 May 2022 against Waldhof Mannheim, coming on as a substitute for Norman Quindt in the 87th minute.

References

External links
 
 
 
 

1983 births
Living people
Footballers from Hanover
German footballers
Association football goalkeepers
Hannover 96 II players
SV Arminia Hannover players
TSV Havelse players
Hannoverscher SC players
3. Liga players
Regionalliga players